K220 or K-220 may refer to:

K-220 (Kansas highway), a former state highway in Kansas
Mass in C major, K. 220 "Sparrow"